The African fish eagle (Haliaeetus vocifer) or the African sea eagle, is a large species of eagle found throughout sub-Saharan Africa wherever large bodies of open water with an abundant food supply occur. It is the national bird of Malawi, Namibia, Zambia, and Zimbabwe. As a result of its large range, it is known in many languages. Examples of names include: Vis Arend in Afrikaans, nkwazi in Chewa, aigle pêcheur in French, hungwe in Shona, inkwazi in isiZulu, and ntšhu (pronounced "ntjhu") in Northern Sotho. This species may resemble the bald eagle in appearance; though related, the two species occurs on different continents, with the bald eagle being resident in North America.

Taxonomy
The African fish eagle is a species placed in the genus Haliaeetus (sea eagles). Its closest relative appears to be the critically endangered Madagascar fish eagle (H. vociferoides). Like all sea eagle species pairs, this one consists of a white-headed species (the African fish eagle) and a tan-headed one (Madagascar fish eagle). These are an ancient lineage of sea eagles; like other sea eagles, they have dark talons, beaks, and eyes Both species have at least partially white tails even as juveniles. The scientific name is derived from Haliaeetus, New Latin for "sea eagle" (from the Ancient Greek haliaetos), and vocifer is derived from its original genus name, so named by the French naturalist François Levaillant, who called it 'the vociferous one'.

Description 

The African fish eagle is a large bird. This is typical sexual dimorphism in birds of prey. The adult is very distinctive in appearance with a mostly brown body with a white head like the bald eagle and large, powerful, black wings. The head, breast, and tail of African fish eagles are snow white, with the exception of the featherless face, which is yellow. The eyes are dark brown in colour. The hook-shaped beak, ideal for a carnivorous lifestyle, is yellow with a black tip. The plumage of the juvenile is brown, and the eyes are paler than the adult's. The feet have rough soles and are equipped with powerful talons to enable the eagle to grasp slippery aquatic prey. While this species mainly subsists on fish, it is opportunistic and may take a wider variety of prey such as waterbirds. Its distinctive cry is, for many, evocative of the spirit or essence of Africa. The call, shriller when uttered by males, is a weee-ah, hyo-hyo or a heee-ah, heeah-heeah.

Distribution and habitat
This species is still quite common near freshwater lakes, reservoirs, and rivers, although it can sometimes be found near the coast at the mouths of rivers or lagoons. African fish eagles are indigenous to sub-Saharan Africa, ranging over most of continental Africa south of the Sahara Desert. Several examples of places where they may be resident include the Orange River in South Africa and Namibia, the Okavango Delta in Botswana, and Lake Malawi bordering Malawi, Tanzania, and Mozambique. The African fish eagle is thought to occur in substantial numbers around the locations of Lake Victoria and other large lakes in central Africa, particularly the Rift Valley lakes. This is a generalist species, requiring only open water with sufficient prey and a good perch, as evidenced by the number of habitat types in which this species may be found, including grassland, swamps, marshes, tropical rainforest, fynbos, and even desert-bordering coastlines, such as that of Namibia. The African fish eagle is absent from arid areas with little surface water.

Reproduction 

African fish eagles breed during the dry season, when water levels are low. They are believed to mate for life. Pairs often maintain two or more nests, which they frequently reuse. The nests are placed in a large tree and are built mostly of sticks and other pieces of wood.

The female lays one to three eggs, which are primarily white with a few reddish speckles. Incubation is mostly done by the female, but the male incubates when the female leaves to hunt. Incubation lasts for 42 to 45 days before the chicks hatch. Siblicide does not normally occur in this taxon, and the parents often successfully rear two or three chicks. Chicks fledge around 70 to 75 days old. Postfledgling dependence lasts up to three months, whereafter the juveniles become nomadic and may congregate in groups away from territorial adults. Those that survive their first year have a life expectancy of some 12 to 24 years.

Diet 

The African fish eagle feeds mainly on fish, which it swoops down upon from a perch in a tree, snatching the prey from the water with its large, clawed talons. The eagle then flies back to its perch to eat its catch. Like other sea eagles, the African fish eagle has structures on its toes called spiricules that allow it to grasp fish and other slippery prey. The osprey, a winter visitor to Africa, also has this adaptation. If it catches a fish too heavy to allow the eagle to sustain flight, it will drop into the water and paddle to the nearest shore with its wings. Mullets and catfish (Clarias) are common prey, though various fish such as cichlids, tilapias (Oreochromis), lungfish (Protopterus), and characins can be also taken. Even African tigerfish (Hydrocynus vittatus) can be preyed upon by fish eagles, especially while predating barn swallows (Hirundo rustica) in flight. 

It also feeds on birds, especially waterbirds such as ducks, cormorants, grebes, darters, hatchlings of herons and egrets, and greater and lesser flamingos. Other prey include small turtles and terrapins, baby crocodiles, Nile monitors, skinks, frogs, insects (especially termites), and carrion. Occasionally, it may even take mammalian prey, such as hyrax, monkeys, rats, hares, and dik diks. It has also been observed feeding on domestic fowl (chickens). The African fish eagle is known to steal the catch of other bird species, a practice known as kleptoparasitism. Targeted species are usually large wading birds such as Goliath herons, hammerkops, and shoebills, as well as kingfishers, pelicans, ospreys, and other fish eagles, which usually hunt large fish and take a long time to handle them.

Relationship with humans

Conservation
This species is listed as least concern by the IUCN. The estimated population size is about 300,000 individuals with a distribution area of 18,300,000 km2.

Heraldry
In the form of the Zimbabwe Bird, it is the national bird of Zimbabwe and appears on the Zimbabwean flag. The bird also figures in the coats of arms of Malawi, Namibia, Zambia, and South Sudan, and on the Zambian flag.

Gallery

References

External links

 African fish eagle - Species text in The Atlas of Southern African Birds

African fish eagle
Birds of prey of Africa
African fish eagle
African fish eagle
Eagles